Lusis is the debut album by Christian industrial band Mortal. Though not the first Christian industrial music album, it helped to popularize the genre. Contemporary Christian music single "Mytho X" became a hit on the Christian metal charts, and Mortal was named the best new band 1992 in a CCM Magazine readers' poll. The album was produced by Terry Scott Taylor of Daniel Amos.

Track listing
 "Enfleshed (The Word Is Alive)" (4:39)
 "Mytho-X" (4:26)
 "If Ever Maria" (4:21)
 "Fisherman" (4:39)
 "Painkiller" (4:51)
 "Tuesday Assassin" (5:39)
 "Rescinding" (4:54)
 "Cryptic" (5:38)
 "Miracle Man" (3:53)
 "Santa Cruz" (4:30)
 "S.F.N." (1:00)
 "Sinister" (5:23)
 "Enfleshed [Alive Is the Word Remix]" (4:38)

Personnel
Jyro Xhan
Jerome Fontamillas

References

1992 albums
Mortal (band) albums